Stokesdale Historic District is a national historic district located at Durham, Durham County, North Carolina. The district encompasses 227 contributing buildings, 1 contributing site, and 1 contributing structure in a historically African-American residential section of Durham. The buildings primarily date between about 1912 and 1960 and include notable examples of Queen Anne, Colonial Revival, Tudor Revival, and Bungalow / American Craftsman architecture.  Notable buildings include Page's Grocery (c. 1913), College Inn (c. 1935), Covenant United Presbyterian Church (1948), and Seventh Day Adventist Church (1954).

It was listed on the National Register of Historic Places in 2010.

References

African-American history in Durham, North Carolina
Historic districts on the National Register of Historic Places in North Carolina
Queen Anne architecture in North Carolina
Colonial Revival architecture in North Carolina
Tudor Revival architecture in North Carolina
Historic districts in Durham, North Carolina
National Register of Historic Places in Durham County, North Carolina
Neighborhoods in Durham, North Carolina